The White Rose is a novel by B. Traven, first published in 1929. Originally published in German by Münchener Post, the first English translation appeared in 1979.

Plot
The novel concerns the efforts of Condor Oil, a (fictional) American oil company, to purchase a Mexican ranch from its unwilling owner.

References

Further reading 

 

1929 German-language novels
Novels set in Mexico
History of the petroleum industry in the United States